Can David Bayram, better known under the stage name Pashanim, (born in 2000 in Berlin, Germany) is a German rapper and filmmaker of Turkish descent.

Life and career 
Bayram was born in Berlin and grew up in the Kreuzberg area.

He started rapping when he was twelve years old, and in 2017, he founded the rap collective Playboysmafia alongside fellow rappers Symba, Abuglitsch, and RB 030. In 2018, he released his first songs via the online distribution site SoundCloud.

Bayram first rose to prominence in early 2020 with the track Shababs botten, peaking at number 84 on the German charts, having gained traction after being widely used on the video-sharing platform TikTok. In May 2020, his single Airwaves reached number two on the German charts, marking his major commercial breakthrough. On December 28, 2020, he released his EP junge ceos 2, premiering three tracks.

In addition to his rapping career, he works as a cinematographer, and has filmed music videos for German artists such as Juju, Nura, and Casper. Furthermore, he has directed the music videos for his own songs Shababs botten, Hauseingang, and Airwaves.

Discography

Mixtapes

Extended Plays

Singles

Featured in

Other songs

Music videos

Awards and nominations

Results

References

External links 
 Pashanim's profile on SoundCloud

2000 births
Living people
German rappers
Musicians from Berlin